The Marshall Court (1801–1835) heard forty-one criminal cases. The Court heard two writs of error from the United States Circuit Court of the District of Columbia under § 8 of the second Judiciary Act of 1801, six original habeas petitions under § 14 of the Judiciary Act of 1789, thirty-one certificates of division under § 6 of the Judiciary Act of 1802, and two writs of error from the state courts under § 25 of the Judiciary Act of 1789.

The criminal jurisdiction of the Marshall Court was greatly limited by the Court's disclaiming of appellate jurisdiction from the United States circuit courts by means of a writ of error in United States v. More (1805), as well as the Court's disclaiming the authority to issue writs of habeas corpus to prisoners detained pursuant to a post-conviction criminal sentence in Ex parte Kearney (1822) and Ex parte Watkins (1830). Certificates of division could only be issued in criminal cases heard by a two-judge panel consisting of a United States district court judge and a Supreme Court justice riding circuit (the district judge or the circuit rider could also hear cases alone). Further, certificates could not be issued with regard to the legal sufficiency of the evidence—whether on a motion for a new trial, as held in United States v. Daniel (1821), or a motion for a directed verdict, as held in United States v. Bailey (1835).

Notes

References
 (1985).

Marshall Court